Brandfort, is a small agricultural town in the central Free State province of South Africa, about 60 km northeast of Bloemfontein on the R30 road. The town serves the surrounding farms for supplies and amenities. It is well known for once being home to the anti-apartheid stalwart and wife of Nelson Mandela, Winnie Mandela, during her banishment.

History
The town was established in 1866 on the farm Keerom, occupied by Jacobus van Zijl who was a Voortrekker elder. The community was visited by the then Orange Free State President, Johannes Brand, and the settlement was named in his honour shortly afterwards. Brandfort was proclaimed a town in 1874. 

The British built a concentration camp here during the Second Anglo-Boer War to house Boer women and children. Brandfort was also at one time home to former prime minister Hendrik Verwoerd, an architect of apartheid, who matriculated here.

Main sites

Concentration camps
Concentration camps, derived from the Spanish word "",  were first used in Cuba in 1896 by General Butcher Weyler. Half a million Cuban civilians were rounded up and incarcerated in fortified villages in which about 100 000 died. In South Africa, the first concentration camps were erected in early 1901 during the Anglo-Boer South African War (1899-1902), also known as the Second Boer War. Thousands of women and children were removed from their farms and towns to the concentration camps.

Conditions in the concentration camps were poor due to overcrowding and inadequate supplies. Malnutrition and disease spread rapidly leading to the deaths of many civilians in these camps.

Segregation persisted during wartime and there was a camp for whites called Dwyersdorp (named after Captain Dwyer who assisted white women and children who had been incarcerated at the camp) and the adjacent one for blacks was called Nooitgedacht.

The camp cemetery was declared a National Monument in 1985 and currently holds Provincial Heritage Site status. It contains the remains of 1263 women and children. The cemetery was opened on 22 September 1962 by President Charles Robberts Swart.

Banishment house of Winnie Mandela
Winnie Mandela (politician, convicted murderer, liberation struggle stalwart and former wife of the late Nelson Mandela) was banished to Brandfort in May 1977. She lived at house number 802 in the black township in Brandfort. The area had no running water and electricity and, when she moved to the house, there were no floors and ceilings.

In the book, Winnie Mandela: A life, she described Brandfort as:

"A drab and dusty rural hamlet with unimaginative houses, an old-fashioned two-storey hotel, small shops lining the main street and a pervading atmosphere of lethargy and inactivity… The forlorn township had no official name but the black residents had baptised it “Phathakahle” meaning handle with care"

The site has been nominated as a National Heritage Site and plans are underway to develop it into a museum.

Other sites
Other monuments and heritage sites

Florisbad archaeological and palaeontological site
The Florisbad archaeological and paleontological site lies about 46 km west of Brandfort and the site was declared a National Monument (now a Provincial Heritage Site) in 1997. The Florisbad Skull, an early hominid from the Middle Stone Age, was found here.

Rear-Admiral John Weston's House MUSEUM. Declared by then President C.R.Swart in the 1960s as a National Monument '
The first aeroplane built in Africa was built in Brandfort on property owned by Rear-Admiral John Weston. The house has been turned into a restaurant and tourist attraction setting out the history of the Rear-Admiral and Brandfort. It has been nominated a National Heritage Site by SAHRA. This is where John Weston lived and designed both the aeroplane and Gnome engine now exhibited by the Bloemfontein Museum. The engine is a Provincial Heritage object of memory. He also designed the first RV/motorised caravan in the world. He travelled through Africa with his family for 18 months from Cape Agulhas to Palestine. Their journey was interrupted because the children had to attend school in England. He married Lily Roux in 1906. They had 3 children: Anna, Kathleen and Max. Weston lived an extraordinary life which came to an abrupt end in 1950 when he was murdered in Bergville.[johnwestonaviator.co.uk]Voortrekker Memorial WallIn front of the Dutch Reformed Church, there is a wall of names which honours Voortrekker settlers in the area.Angel statue'''

This statue stands prominently in front of the Dutch Reformed Church. It commemorates the Boer women and children (and also farm workers) who died in the Brandfort concentration camps during the South African War.

Economy 

Due to a dwindling economy, Brandfort is a ghost town as of 2021 compared with what it was in previous decades. Brandfort was a neat town, known for its good schools, many professional inhabitants and businesses, agricultural co-operatives, good community health services, social support structures, quality sport and recreational facilities, caravan park, hotel and water reservoir. The poor maintenance of these facilities is evident today - the museums and monuments are deteriorating and no plan currently exists to save them from further decay.

The Admiral John Weston House Museum is under new management and the house is undergoing renovations. It is open to the public and entrance is free of charge. School educational visits are held on a regular basis.

The majority of the people in Brandfort are financially supported solely by government grants. There are only full-time employment opportunities for about 3% of the people.

References

External links

Brandfort attractions  (Office of tourism of the Free State)
Brandfort on showme.co.za
Winnie Mandela banished Brandfort (salhistory.org.za)

Populated places in the Masilonyana Local Municipality
Second Boer War concentration camps
Populated places established in 1875
1875 establishments in the Orange Free State